Jean-Michel Grobon (19 December 1770, in Lyon – 2 September 1853, in Lyon) was a French painter and engraver; primarily of landscapes and genre scenes. He is considered to be a major representative of the Lyon School.

Biography 
His father, Paul, was originally engaged in passementerie, but later became a Master Chef. His mother, Jeanne Chapard, was the daughter of a sugar cane merchant. He was in poor health as a child. At the age of nine, his parents placed him in the local abbey, where he received his primary education and was employed as an altar server. A difficult student, he often got into fights and spent his time in class drawing. In 1782, he was moved to a similar position in Crémieu, where his behavior improved.

In 1789, he and a friend went to Paris to register at the Académie royale de peinture et de sculpture. It was then that he created his first paintings. The events of the French Revolution made it impossible to remain there and prevented him from making a planned study trip to Rome. During this time, he supported himself by painting still-lifes and scenes with animals. Shortly, however, he decided to switch to painting landscapes en plein air and moved to La Croix-Rousse, where he lived with the Carthusians. An offer to become a priest was refused.

While on a leave, arranged by a friend who was a doctor, his entire unit was killed. He chose not to return to service and was forced to flee. During the Siege of Lyon, he helped his mother hide their personal belongings, then went into hiding. He was found and denounced, but fled again, finding refuge in a friend's aviary. He would later say that he created some of his best paintings there, and he was able to send some of them to the Salon in 1796. It eventually became safe to return to Lyon and he lived in an apartment provided by Jean-Jacques de Boissieu. His contributions to the Salon of 1800 were praised by Jacques-Louis David.

He became a member of the Academy of Lyon and was named a Professor of Drawing at a local school in 1801. His exhibit of landscapes at the Salon of 1806 was a failure, but Napoleon himself ordered that he be given a gold medal and 500 Francs; although he received only 250. The Salon of 1812 was also a disappointment. In 1813, he became one of the first local artists to go on display at the Museum of Fine Arts of Lyon. He then accepted an appointment as a Professor at the École nationale supérieure des beaux-arts de Lyon; having turned down that offer the year before. It is said that he refused the Legion of Honor three times. In 1819, due to his continuous, hectic work pace, he developed rheumatism and began spending time at the spa in Aix-les-Bains.

Upon the outbreak of the July Revolution, the Director of the École nationale, fled to Avignon and Victor Prunelle, the Mayor of Lyon, asked Grobon to fill the position. He reluctantly agreed, but only on a provisional basis. Prunelle nominated him for the Legion of Honor but, once again, he demurred.

He also gave up his position on a committee that chose works of art to be acquired by the city. In addition to his considerable savings, he was awarded a life annuity. He continued to take a few private students until his death, at his home, in 1853.

References

Further reading 
 Fleury-Richard, Notice sur Michel Grobon, In: La revue du Lyonnais
 Étienne Grafe, L'œuvre de Jean-Michel Grobon (1770-1853) au Musée des Beaux-Arts de Lyon, Lyon : Musée des Beaux-Arts, 1983 
 Bernard Gouttenoire, Lyon, le paysage des peintres, Chatillon-sur-Chalaronne (Ain) : Ed. la Taillanderie, 2001

External links 

 More works by Grobon @ ArtNet

1770 births
1853 deaths
18th-century French painters
French landscape painters
French genre painters
Artists from Lyon
19th-century French painters